Catherine Bader-Bille is a paralympic athlete from Germany competing mainly in category F46 long jump events.

In 2000 Catherine competed in the 100m and long jump in the Paralympics winning the F46 long jump.

References

Paralympic athletes of Germany
Athletes (track and field) at the 2000 Summer Paralympics
Medalists at the 2000 Summer Paralympics
Paralympic gold medalists for Germany
Living people
World record holders in Paralympic athletics
Year of birth missing (living people)
Paralympic medalists in athletics (track and field)
German female sprinters
German female long jumpers
Sprinters with limb difference
Long jumpers with limb difference
Paralympic sprinters
Paralympic long jumpers